HMS Violet was a Doxford three-funnel, 30-knot destroyer ordered by the Royal Navy under the 1896–1897 Naval Estimates.  She was the seventh ship to carry this name since it was introduced in 1588 for a 200-ton vessel.

Construction and career
She was laid down on 13 July 1896, at the William Doxford and Sons shipyard in Pallion, Sunderland, and launched on 3 May 1897.  During her builder's trials, she made her contracted speed requirement.  She was completed and accepted by the Royal Navy in June 1898. After commissioning she was assigned to the Devonport Flotilla and spent her entire career in home waters.

She underwent repairs to re-tube her boilers in 1902. On 9 July 1907 Violet collided with a sailing vessel, badly damaging the destroyer's bow and slightly injuring three of her crew. She was towed stern first to the Nore by the destroyer  before being taken into Sheerness for repair. Violet was refitted at Pembroke Dockyard in 1909, having her bow replated and her boilers retubed.

On 30 August 1912 the Admiralty directed all destroyer classes were to be designated by alpha characters starting with the letter 'A'. After 30 September 1913, she was known as a C-class destroyer and had the letter ‘C’ painted on the hull below the bridge area and on either the fore or aft funnel.

World War I
August 1914 found her in active commission in the 7th Destroyer Flotilla based at Devonport tendered to HMS Leander.  She served there until September 1917 when she was sent to join the local defence flotilla at the Nore.

In April 1918 she was reassigned to the 6th Destroyer Flotilla and the Dover Patrol.  She remained in this deployment for the duration of the First World War.  Her duties included anti-submarine, counter-mining patrols, and patrolling the Dover Barrage.

In 1919 she was paid off and laid-up in reserve, awaiting disposal.  Violet was sold on 7 June 1920 to J Houston of Montrose for breaking.

Pennant numbers

References
Note:  All tabular data under general characteristics only from the listed Jane's Fighting Ships volume unless otherwise specified

Bibliography
 
 
 
 
 
 
 
 

 

Ships built on the River Wear
1897 ships
C-class destroyers (1913)
World War I destroyers of the United Kingdom